USS Edith, a screw steamer, was transferred from the War Department to the U.S. Navy under congressional legislation of 3 March 1849, and turned over to Commodore Thomas ap Catesby Jones, Commander-in-Chief of the Pacific Squadron, at San Francisco, California. On 16 June Lieutenant James McCormick was ordered to report on the condition of the steamer; subsequently, he was placed in temporary command with orders to transport representatives to the California State Constitutional Convention.
 
USS Edith departed Sausalito, California on 23 August 1849 en route to Santa Barbara, California, but encountered dense fog which made accurate observations impossible.  On the morning of 24 August she grounded on an uninhabited part of the coast and was lost. A court of inquiry held in January 1850 exonerated her commander and his crew from any guilt.

The warship may appear on the Seal of California, although there is no scholarly consensus on the matter.

References 
 

Steamships of the United States Navy